DLT, born Darryl Thomson, is a New Zealand DJ, music producer, composer and artist. He was born in Maraenui, New Zealand.

Music career

DLT was inspired by an article about rap and breakdancing in Life magazine when he was 16 years of age; he moved to Wellington in the 1980s and established himself as a graffiti artist known as 'SLICK' (1983) before co-founding hip hop group Upper Hutt Posse. The Posse released New Zealand's first hip hop record, E Tū, in 1988 and then moved to Auckland. Upper Hutt Posse signed to Murray Cammick's label, Southside Records, and released the album Against The Flow in 1989.

Leaving the Upper Hutt Posse, DLT released two solo albums. The first, The True School, contained the single "Chains", which was the number one single in New Zealand for five weeks in 1996 and featured the vocals of Che Fu. In the 1997 New Zealand Music Awards "Chains" was named Single of the Year and won the Best Songwriting award. Che Fu was named Best Male Vocalist. It was number 22 in the 2001 APRA listing of the Greatest New Zealand Songs of the previous 75 years.

DLT's production work in the 1980s and 1990s was a pointer to and influential on the reggae-flavoured downbeat styles that have found favour in New Zealand in recent years.

His radio and TV work in New Zealand, especially The True School Show on Radio 95bFM, has been important in the development of hip hop in New Zealand.  DLT hosted 'Trueschool TV' on Max TV in 1996 with DJ Sir-Vere – they were later poached for MTV's 'Wreckognise' show, which gave them nationwide coverage.

DLT is often described as the Godfather of New Zealand Hip Hop.

Art

DLT is an accomplished sculptor, graffiti artist, graphic artist and painter.

Discography

See also
 New Zealand hip hop

References

External links
 AudioCulture profile
 NZ Music Profile
 Loops And Samples Profile
 Discogs Page

APRA Award winners
New Zealand musicians
Ngāti Kahungunu people
Living people
Year of birth missing (living people)